Bryan Hall is a historic building in Gainesville, Florida, United States. It is in the northeastern section of the University of Florida in Gainesville. On June 27, 1979, it was added to the U.S. National Register of Historic Places. Bryan Hall is part of the Warrington College of Business. The building also was home to the College of Law from 1914 to 1969.

Namesake
Bryan Hall is named for Nathan Philemon Bryan, an attorney, U.S. Senator, and judge who successfully fought for the establishment of a law school at the University of Florida while serving as chairman of the State Board of Control.

See also
University of Florida
Buildings at the University of Florida
Warrington College of Business
Campus Historic District

References

External links
 Alachua County listings at National Register of Historic Places
 Alachua County listings at Florida's Office of Cultural and Historical Programs
 Virtual tour of University of Florida Campus Historic District at Alachua County's Department of Growth Management
 The University of Florida Historic Campus at UF Facilities Planning & Construction
 George A. Smathers Libraries
 UF Builds: The Architecture of the University of Florida
 Bryan Hall

National Register of Historic Places in Gainesville, Florida
Buildings at the University of Florida
William Augustus Edwards buildings
Guy Fulton buildings
University and college buildings on the National Register of Historic Places in Florida
1914 establishments in Florida
University and college buildings completed in 1914